

Baptist Knieß (17 April 1885 - 10 November 1956 ) was a German general during World War II who held several commands at division and corps level.

Sources 
 
 
 

1885 births
1956 deaths
German Army generals of World War II
Generals of Infantry (Wehrmacht)
German Army personnel of World War I
Reichswehr personnel
German prisoners of war in World War II
Recipients of the clasp to the Iron Cross, 1st class
Recipients of the Gold German Cross
People from Grünstadt
Military personnel from Rhineland-Palatinate